Swarn is both a given name and surname. Notable people with the name include:

 Swarn Noora, Punjabi singer
 Swarn Singh Kalsi, Indian engineer
 George Swarn (born 1964), American football player

See also
 Swan (surname)